Jamie Cripps (born 23 April 1992) is an Australian rules footballer who plays for the West Coast Eagles in the Australian Football League (AFL). Cripps is a cousin of two other AFL players, Patrick Cripps (Carlton) and Chris Mainwaring (West Coast).

Junior career
Originally from Northampton, Western Australia, Cripps participated in the Auskick program at Northampton and played his junior football for Western Australian Football League team East Fremantle Football Club, making his senior debut in 2009, before playing another six games in 2010 and representing Western Australia at the 2010 AFL Under 18 Championships.

Cripps was recruited to AFL club  with the 24th selection in the 2010 AFL Draft. Shortly after being drafted, Cripps was admitted to hospital suffering from a diabetes-related illness. It was reported that St Kilda were unaware that Cripps was diabetic before they drafted him.

AFL career
Cripps made his AFL debut as the substitute player in St Kilda's Round 6 match against  at AAMI Stadium.  He performed well, scoring two goals with his first two kicks of the game.

At the end of the 2012 season, he was traded to the West Coast Eagles along with draft pick 46 in exchange for draft picks 41 and 44.

Personal life
Cripps married his long term partner in October 2021 at a ceremony at a brewery in Western Australia's Margaret River wine region.

Statistics
Statistics are correct to the end of round 20, 2019

|- style="background-color: #EAEAEA"
! scope="row" style="text-align:center" | 2011
|style="text-align:center;"|
| 35 || 4 || 7 || 2 || 16 || 10 || 26 || 3 || 6 || 1.8 || 0.5 || 4.0 || 2.5 || 6.5 || 0.8 || 1.5
|-
! scope="row" style="text-align:center" | 2012
|style="text-align:center;"|
| 35 || 12 || 9 || 7 || 69 || 48 || 117 || 35 || 32 || 0.8 || 0.6 || 5.8 || 4.0 || 9.8 || 2.9 || 2.7
|- style="background:#eaeaea;"
! scope="row" style="text-align:center" | 2013
|style="text-align:center;"|
| 15 || 15 || 12 || 5 || 91 || 66 || 157 || 42 || 61 || 0.8 || 0.3 || 6.1 || 4.4 || 10.5 || 2.8 || 4.1
|-
! scope="row" style="text-align:center" | 2014
|style="text-align:center;"|
| 15 || 19 || 27 || 14 || 136 || 80 || 216 || 57 || 72 || 1.4 || 0.7 || 7.2 || 4.2 || 11.4 || 3.0 || 3.8
|- style="background:#eaeaea;"
! scope="row" style="text-align:center" | 2015
|style="text-align:center;"|
| 15 || 25 || 34 || 30 || 218 || 127 || 345 || 103 || 139 || 1.4 || 1.2 || 8.7 || 5.1 || 13.8 || 4.1 || 5.6
|-
! scope="row" style="text-align:center" | 2016
|style="text-align:center;"|
| 15 || 23 || 28 || 18 || 193 || 99 || 292 || 92 || 94 || 1.2 || 0.8 || 8.4 || 4.3 || 12.7 || 4.0 || 4.1
|- style="background:#eaeaea;"
! scope="row" style="text-align:center" | 2017
|style="text-align:center;"|
| 15 || 21 || 26 || 18 || 183 || 102 || 285 || 90 || 79 || 1.2 || 0.9 || 8.7 || 4.9 || 13.6 || 4.3 || 3.8
|-
|style="text-align:center;background:#afe6ba;"|2018†
|style="text-align:center;"|
| 15 || 25 || 38 || 18 || 249 || 149 || 398 || 122 || 97 || 1.5 || 0.7 || 10.0 || 6.0 || 15.9 || 4.9 || 3.9
|- style="background:#eaeaea;"
! scope="row" style="text-align:center" | 2019
|style="text-align:center;"|
| 15 || 14 || 5 || 2 || 34 || 33 || 67 || 20 || 13 || 1.0 || 0.4 || 6.8 || 6.6 || 13.4 || 4.0 || 2.6
|- class="sortbottom"
! colspan=3| Career
! 149 !! 186 !! 114 !! 1189 !! 714 !! 1903 !! 564 !! 593 !! 1.2 !! 0.8 !! 8.0 !! 4.8 !! 12.8 !! 3.8 !! 4.0
|}

References

External links

St Kilda Football Club players
Living people
1992 births
Australian rules footballers from Western Australia
East Fremantle Football Club players
People from Northampton, Western Australia
West Coast Eagles players
West Coast Eagles Premiership players
Sandringham Football Club players
One-time VFL/AFL Premiership players